Henriciella pelagia is a Gram-negative, aerobic, short-rod-shaped and motile bacterium from the genus of Henriciella which has been isolated from seawater from the Eastern Pacific Ocean.

References 

Caulobacterales
Bacteria described in 2017